is a former sumo wrestler from Ōno, Fukui, Japan. He made his professional debut in July 1971, and reached the top division in November, 1983. His highest rank was komusubi. He retired in September 1990, and has worked as a coach at both the original Nishonoseki stable and the new version of the stable, under the elder name Minatogawa.

Career
He did kendo at junior high school. He entered Nishonoseki stable and began his sumo career in July 1971. In July 1979 he was undefeated in all seven of his makushita bouts but lost a playoff for the yusho to Sadanoumi. He reached the juryo division in January 1980, but lasted only one tournament before being demoted. He returned to juryo in July 1982 and reached the top makuuchi division in November 1983. In July 1985 he defeated yokozuna Chiyonofuji to earn his first kinboshi. In March 1987 he was promoted to komusubi, becoming the first wrestler from Fukui Prefecture to reach a sanyaku rank since the beginning of the Showa era. He held the rank for just a single tournament.  He became the only wrestler from the Nishonoseki stable left in makuuchi in September 1988 when Kirinji retired. In January 1989 he returned to the juryo division where he spent the remainder of his career. He took part in two playoffs for the juryo championship in May and July 1989, but lost both, to Komafudo and Ryukozan, leaving him without a career yusho in any division. He retired in September 1990. He had not missed a bout in his professional career. He had 587 wins against 612 losses in 1199 bouts over 116 tournaments. His top division record was 209 wins against 256 losses over 31 tournaments.

He was friendly with sumo fan Demon Kogure, and appeared on his radio show All Night Nippon. Demon Kogure was also a guest at Daitetsu's danpatsu-shiki or official retirement ceremony.

Retirement from sumo
Daitestu remained in sumo as an elder of the Japan Sumo Association, under the name of Minatogawa Oyakata. He coached at Nishonoseki stable until it folded in January 2013. He transferred to Matsugane stable, which changed its name to Nishonoseki stable in 2014.  He has also been a member of the judging department. From March 2014 until March 2018 he was of three oyakata appointed as members of the board of trustees as the Sumo Association applied for public interest corporation status. He reached the mandatory retirement age for elders of 65 in October 2021, but was re-hired by the Sumo Association as a consultant for a further five years.

Fighting style
Daitetsu was a yotsu-sumo wrestler who preferred a hidari-yotsu (right hand outside, left hand inside) grip on his opponent's mawashi. His most common winning kimarite was yori-kiri (force out). He was above average height which meant he regularly employed tsuri-dashi (lift out). He also used uwatenage (overarm throw).

Career record

See also
Glossary of sumo terms
List of past sumo wrestlers
List of sumo elders
List of komusubi

References

1956 births
Living people
Japanese sumo wrestlers
People from Ōno, Fukui
Sumo people from Fukui Prefecture
Komusubi